26 June District is a district in Hargeisa, Somaliland. It is one of the eight administrative districts of Hargeisa City. June 26 is the date of independence of British Somaliland as the State of Somaliland in 1960.

See also
Administrative divisions of Somaliland
Regions of Somaliland
Districts of Somaliland

References

Districts of Hargeisa